Ođđasat is a Sami television news programme broadcast in Norway, Sweden and Finland.
Jointly produced by NRK, SVT and YLE, the public-service broadcasters in their respective countries, the programme is presented from NRK's studio in Norway. When the production of the programme began, its titles and graphics were different from NRK's domestic television news bulletins. In around 2008, the programme saw a new look; while it still differed from the revamped look of the rest of NRK's bulletins at the time, the lower thirds (as well as the subtitles on NRK's broadcast) were set in the same grid of graphics that NRK's bulletins used. It also utilised the Neo Sans typeface (NRK's on-screen typeface at the time) for its presentation. In mid-2015, about a month after NRK's domestic bulletins revamped their look, Ođđasat followed with the new corporate look and theme music.

It is broadcast five days a week, ten months a year. Each programme is around 15 minutes long and deals mostly with Sami issues but also has Nordic and world news, often dealing with other indigenous peoples. The news is broadcast in Northern Sami and is subtitled in either Finnish, Norwegian or Swedish for the respective areas (Swedish subtitles are also utilised on Yle Fem's broadcast).

See also
 Yle Uutiset: Yle produces a separate five-minute television bulletin titled Yle Ođđasat that focuses on the Sami people in Finland, broadcast weekday afternoons on Yle TV1.

External links 
 Yle's online news in Sami 
 NRK Sápmi 
 SR Sameradion and SVT Sápmi 

Northern Sámi-language mass media
Sámi mass media
Sveriges Television original programming
Swedish television news shows
Finnish television news shows
Norwegian television news shows
NRK original programming
Yle original programming